Dejan Miljuš (born 24 October 1994) is a Serbian football forward.

Club career

Radnički Kragujevac
Miljuš has started playing football in academy named "Fitness" in Kragujevac at the age of 6, along with his twin brother Dejan. After 5 years, they moved to the local Radnički. After he passed youth categories, Miljuš was loaned as a scholar to the Serbian League West side Pobeda Beloševac, where he was trained by Željko Milošević, former defender, and captain of Radnički Kragujevac. Playing with Pobeda, Miljuš collected 14 caps in the first half of the 2013–14 Serbian League West season with 5 goals. He scored 5 goals in matches against Partizan Bumbarevo Brdo, Bane, Jošanica, Seljak and Krušik.

During the winter break off-season, Miljuš scored several goals in some friendly matches with Radnički, and proved himself to be involved in the first team. He made his professional debut for Radnički Kragujevac in 16 fixture of the 2013–14 Serbian SuperLiga season, replacing Dragan Čadikovski in 88 minute of the match against Radnički Niš, played on 23 February 2014 at the Čika Dača Stadium. In his second match for the team, Miljuš scored in a spectacular away game against Napredak Kruševac.

Career statistics

Club

Honours
Radnički Kragujevac
 Serbian League West: 2016–17

Personal life
Around a year after he was born, the Miljuš family moved from Knin to Kragujevac, due to Operation Storm. His twin brother, Bojan, is also footballer.

Notes

References

External links
 Dejan Miljuš stats at utakmica.rs 
 
 
 

1994 births
Living people
Sportspeople from Knin
Serbs of Croatia
People from the Republic of Serbian Krajina
Association football forwards
Serbian footballers
FK Radnički 1923 players
Serbian First League players
Serbian SuperLiga players
Twin sportspeople